Khan Sahib Shahal Khan Khoso (1909–1956) came from a family which had, since the many last centuries, been prominent among the landed aristocracy of the Sindh. He was a Member of the West Pakistan Legislative Assembly from 1953 to 1956, belonging to Khoso Baloch family of Thul district Jacobabad Sindh. His grandfather Dilmurad Khan khoso revolted against British in 1857 and was sent to Andaman Island.

Title of Khan Sahib 
In 1943, he was awarded with the honourable title of Khan Sahib. Lord Wavell, the second last viceroy of India appreciated his help in the war efforts of the country.

Political services 

He rendered great services to the betterment of his constituents, and received many
letters of appreciations of high British officials of the colonial period in the country.

 26 November 1929: Affrinama from Governor of Bombay (Sir Frederick Hugh Sykes) appreciating the good services rendered by him in supplying food and labour during the floods.
 9 January 1931: Letter of appreciation from the Deputy Commissioner Upper Sind Frontier for rendering assistance in closing breaches and various Govt. departments.
 4 March 1932: Letter of appreciation and thanks from Governor of Bombay (Michael Herbert Rudolph) for valuable assistance given in the census of 1931
 15 January 1934: Shahal khan was granted a chair in the Durbar of the Commissioner in Sind (Raymond Evelyn)
 14 December 1935: Letter of appreciation and thanks from The Commissioner in Sind (Raymond Evelyn) for good service rendered by Shahal khan on the occasion of Her Majesties' Silver Jubilee celebrations.
 20 July 1936: Letter of appreciation from Chief Engineer in Sind for the help rendered to Public Works Department during the Abkalani of 1935.
 7 January 1937: Letter of appreciation from the Governor of Sind Sir Lancelot Graham for the good service rendered by Shahal khan at the time of the construction of the new head to the Begari Canal and in assisting the general administration.
 20 January 1939: Deputy Commissioner USF and President Jacobabad Show committee awarded him second prize in class III C at the Agricultural show of 1939. He also received Third prize in class I at the cattle show of 1939.
 2 February 1939: His Excellency the Governor of Sind Sir Lancelot Graham appreciated the good services rendered by him to all departments of Government and especially in completing the work of improvement to Unerwah.
 18 January 1940: Deputy Commissioner USF and President Jacobabad Show committee awarded him First prize in class I at the cattle show of 1940.
 10 February 1940: The District Superintendent of Police USF sent an affrinama thanking him for his assistance to the police in Dacoities and miscellaneous cases.

Social services

 29 July 1940: Shahal khan Khoso had generously subscribed a sum of Rs five hundred towards the purchase of a fighter or Bomber plane in the Sind Squadron. For this he received a certificate from the Sind War Planes Fund signed by the Governor of Sind Sir Lancelot Graham.
 7 January 1941: Sir Lancelot Graham, the Governor of Sind had heard with much pleasure of the good services rendered by Shahal khan in the maintenance of public peace in his district during the period of communal disturbances in the neighbouring district of Sukkur in November and December 1939. Shahal khan was awarded an affrinama with a lungi.
 13 January 1941: The secretary to the Governor of Sind Sir Hugh Dow writes to Shahal Khan Khoso" I am directed by His Excellency the Governor to express his thanks to you as one of the hosts at the garden party today at which a purse containing one thousand rupees was presented to His Excellency as a contribution to His Excellency's War Fund out of the subscriptions for the expenses of the garden Party"
 22 January 1942: The chairman District Sudhar committee Jacobabad awarded a certificate of Merit to Shahal Khan Khoso in appreciation of his valuable help rendered on the occasion of the Rural Re-construction show Jacobabad.
 3 May 1943: General Commander-in-Chief in India, Mr. Wavell in a letter of acknowledgement writes to Shahal Khan Khoso: “I desire most gratefully to acknowledge your gift for the use of the Defence Services, which I have great pleasure in accepting on their behalf. As you know we need all the equipment of this type that we can get. I can assure you that your gift will be put to good use, and that it represents a very real and acceptable contribution to India’s War efforts”
 24 November 1943: The Governor of Sind Sir Hugh Dow in his letter of appreciation writes to Shahal khan Khoso:” His Excellency has heard with much pleasure of the good service rendered by you in promoting the war efforts in your district in many ways. He presents you in Durbar with this affrinama and trusts that you will continue to do good service in future whenever it may be required of you”
 21 December 1943: The Director Public Instructions/Educational Inspector in Sind presents an Affrinama to Shahal khan Khoso: ”This certificate is presented to you in recognition of the good and willing service rendered by you in the spread of education in Sind and as a mark of approbation”
 18 March 1944: The Governor of Sind Sir Hugh Dow in his letter of thanks writes to Shahal Khan "I wish to convey to you my very great thanks for the contribution of Rs 2500/- to the purse presented to His Excellency the Governor at the District War Committee on March *18th. I trust that you will continue to help the war effort in future as you have always done in the past"
1 January 1946: Viceroy of India Mr. Wavell in a Sanad (Certificate) confers upon him the title of Khan Sahib as a personal distinction.
 21 January 1949: The Governor of Sind Mr. Din Mohammad Sheikh in an affrinama to Khan Sahib Shahal Khan states that he has heard with much pleasure of the good service rendered by him in supplying labour at the Begari Regulator and Shahiwah head during the floods of 1948

Family life
Shahal khan khoso's father was Bahadur Khan Khoso of village Bahadurpur(Jacobabad). Shahal Khan was born in Bahadurpur and married Hajira, the daughter of Mureed Khan khoso in 1924. Their son Ghulam Hussain Khan khoso (1926–1981) inherited land from his father and remained a well known zamindar of the district and contested many local bodies elections and remained Chairman of his Union Council. He joined Jamiat ul ulma e Pakistan in 1977. Khan sahib's another son Bahadur khan unfortunately could not achieve much in life. Ghulam Hussain khan khoso's son Dr Zahid hussain khoso,a Medical Doctor, graduated from Sindh medical College Karachi is now running the family farm in Bachro.

References

Sindh Assembly of Pakistan 

Pakistani politicians
1956 deaths
1909 births